A pull-tight seal (or pull-up seal) is a disposable tamper-evident seal which restricts access to closed objects for those who do not have access. The tightening seal is needed in cases where the use of more sophisticated security measures are impossible or impractical. The seal is not established for the physical protection of the object which is sealed, but for indicating attempts to interfere.

Layers of security 
The tightening seal (Pull-up type) uses multiple layers of security: 
an individual number; 
an individual logo; 
protection for the latching mechanism against direct access; 
the ability to control of a condition of the locking mechanism (collet); 
a material of collet production; 
labeling method (pad printing or laser marking).

Any attempt to circumvent one of these protections must be visible easily and immediately.

Access control 
The seal gives users the opportunity to provide access control to objects such as warehouses, vehicles, containers, gas stations, offices, vault cash in banks, cash collection bags, slot machines, lockers, luggage and many other objects. Also food (fish, meat, honey) and fur animals can be protected from forgery.

Design 

The design of the pull-tight seal is configured of plastic in the form of arrows. They have a surface for marking an individual number and latching mechanism on the one hand, and a plastic cable on the other. Like a zip tie, the cable forms a loop during mill threading into the collet, which can not be separated without damaging the cable or the locking mechanism. Its integrity is monitored through a transparent cover.

Advantages and disadvantages 
Advantages: 
the possibility of visual control of integrity; 
easy to install; 
high quality; 
can not be opened without damage; 
unique numbering; 
favorable price. 
Disadvantages: 
seal’s material is easily broken and can not serve as a fastening element.

Security